Petrovsky is a rural locality (a settlement) in Ikryaninsky District, Astrakhan Oblast, Russia. The population was 16 as of 2010. There are 3 streets.

Geography 
Petrovsky is located 38 km south of Ikryanoye (the district's administrative centre) by road. Sedlistoye is the nearest rural locality.

References 

Rural localities in Ikryaninsky District